Bodotria scorpioides is a species of crustacean belonging to the order Cumacea. They are found in the East Atlantic, the Mediterranean and the Black Sea. B. scorpioides does not possess a free telson. The first thoracic somite is too short to be seen from above, the second is longer. Both males and females have exopods (outer branches) on the first pereopods only.

References

External links 

Cumacea
Crustaceans of the Atlantic Ocean
Fauna of the Black Sea
Fauna of the Mediterranean Sea
Taxa named by George Montagu (naturalist)
Crustaceans described in 1804